Fulgencio de la Vega y Santos (5 November 1805 – 1 August 1868) nicknamed "Tata Vega" was a Conservative Nicaraguan politician that is often credited with moving the Nicaraguan capital to Managua. He served as 9th Supreme Director from November 1851 to 1852. He was preceded by José de Jesús Alfaro and succeeded by José Laureano Pineda Ugarte.

Background 
He was born in Granada on 5 November 1805 from the marriage of Deogracias de la Vega y Fajardo with Josefina Santos Argüello. He married Mercedes Vega Chamorro who was his first cousin, daughter of his paternal uncle, Francisco la Vega and Fajardo with Josefa Chamorro, the illustrious hero of 11 November 1811.

Early Military Career 
He always militated on the conservative side next to Brigadier General Fruto Chamorro, he is a prototype character in Nicaraguan political history as he exemplifies the typical Creole leader with all his qualities and defects. He was energetic, endowed with striking cunning and proven bravery, and was called "Borbollón" because he spoke loudly.

His participation in politics were always prominent from a very young age, such as when Colonel Cleto Ordóñez launched the first social revolution in Nicaragua, Vega, who was only 19, saw how the Oligarchs were persecuted and snatched and rolled on the ground.

He participated in the first civil war in 1827, as well as the anti-constitutionalist rebellion of 1834 during the government of José Núñez,  His name is linked to important events in the early history of Nicaragua; since there was no event from 1830 to 1868, mainly in Granada, that he did not count on his active participation.

As Supreme Director 

At dawn on 4 August 1851, General José Trinidad Muñoz carried out a military coup against Laureano Pineda and organized a Provisional Government based in León naming Justo Abaunza Interim Supreme Director.

The Assembly reunited in Managua, replied to the uprising of Muñoz, naming Senator José Francisco del Montenegro, Supreme Director in the absence of Pineda, who organized his government in Granada.

With the sudden death of the Montenegro, José de Jesús Alfaro took over temporarily until the Assembly, to fill the vacancy, conferred the High Position on Senator Vega, who, in the exercise of Supreme Command, commuted the death sentence handed down against General Muñoz for the expatriation to El Salvador, made effective in October 1851.

Flugencio's Caudillismo 

He was a popular caudillo and those who followed him fervently believed in him, because he was all for public service. Any commotion in Granada's political life would have repercussions in Vega's house, and people wondered: "What does 'Tata' Vega say?"

To give an idea of what Vega's caudillismo was, it is said that once his followers came to propose the candidacy for Supreme Director of the State, laughing he told them:

"The Supreme Director is a Nicaraguan who serves Nicaraguans without distinction of political color, seeing only the general interests of the Nation. Without hesitation he cuts the bad finger, not allowing incorrect handling even if they are from his own supporters. On the other hand, the caudillo is a man dedicated solely to benefiting his supporters, without seeing any defect in them. The caudillo gives his friends everything, even his pants, and for them he sacrifices himself day and night."

He concluded by asking:

"What do you want? To see Fulgencio Vega as Supreme Director or for him to continue being a caudillo?"

And mockingly they said with one voice: "Caudillo!"

References 

Conservative Party (Nicaragua) politicians